Chumpe (possibly from chumpi Jaqaru for corn with yellow seeds and Quechua for belt; or ch'umpi Jaqaru for red and Quechua for brown),  is a mountain in the north of the Pariacaca mountain range in the Andes of Peru, about  high. It is situated in the Junín Region, Yauli Province, in the districts of Huay-Huay and Yauli District. Chumpe lies east of Lake Pumacocha. The mining town of San Cristóbal is situated at its feet.

References

Mountains of Peru
Mountains of Junín Region